Mount Muhabura, also known as Mount Muhavura, is an inactive volcano in the Virunga Mountains on the border between Rwanda and Uganda. At  Muhabura is the third highest of the eight major mountains of the mountain range, which is a part of the Albertine Rift, the western branch of the East African Rift. Its summit contains a small crater lake. The limited evidence for this volcano suggests that it last erupted some time in the Holocene, but the exact date is not known. Muhabura is partly in the Volcanoes National Park, Rwanda and partly in the Mgahinga Gorilla National Park, Uganda.

The name Muhabura means "The Guide" in the local language, Kinyarwanda.

It can be seen from many parts of Uganda and Rwanda because of its slope.

See also
 List of volcanoes in Rwanda
 List of volcanoes in Uganda

References

External links 
 Hike Muhabura Volcano with Bamboo Ecotours
 Mount Muhabura (Muhavura)

Mount Muhabura
International mountains of Africa
Volcanoes of Africa
Mountains of Rwanda
Mountains of Uganda
Stratovolcanoes of Rwanda
Stratovolcanoes of Uganda
Mount Muhabura
Mount Muhabura
Four-thousanders of Africa